Harold K. Michael (October 9, 1943 - ) is an American insurance agent from Moorefield, West Virginia, who has served as a Democratic member of the West Virginia House of Delegates representing what is now the 47th District since 1988.

Background 
Born October 9, 1943, son of Merl H. and Flossie V. Michael, Michael has studied at Strayer University, and is an insurance agent by profession (he is past President of the West Virginia Nationwide Insurance Agents).

Legislative service 
He served as Democratic Majority Whip during the 72nd Legislature; and as Chairman of the standing committee on finance during the 73rd, 74th, 75th, 76th and 77th Legislatures.

Personal life 
He is married to the former Patricia Burns; their children are Harold K. Jr., Melissa Lee, Brandi M., and Tasha Nichole Michael. He is a Methodist and a Freemason.

References

External links 
 

1943 births
Insurance agents
Living people
Democratic Party members of the West Virginia House of Delegates
People from Moorefield, West Virginia